"Breathe" is a song by Canadian alternative rock group Moist. It was released in May 1999 as the lead single from their third studio album, Mercedes 5 and Dime. The song peaked at number 28 on the Canadian RPM Singles Chart. The song is featured on the soundtrack of the 1999 film, Stir of Echoes.

Tom Lord-Alge Mix
In 1999, the song was mixed by Tom Lord-Alge and released as a single. The TLA Mixed version is featured on the MuchMusic compilation album, Big Shiny Tunes 4.

Music video
The music video for "Breathe" was directed by Phil Harder and reached #1 on MuchMusic Countdown.

Charts

References

External links

1999 singles
Moist (Canadian band) songs
1999 songs
EMI Records singles
Music videos directed by Phil Harder
Songs written by David Usher